The Men's marathon B2 was a marathon event in athletics at the 1992 Summer Paralympics, for visually impaired athletes. British champion from the 1988 Games Stephen Brunt successfully defended his title in a time of 2:45:10, ten seconds slower from his previous winning time. Of the twelve starters, ten reached the finish line.

Results

See also
 Marathon at the Paralympics

References 

Men's marathon B2
1992 marathons
Marathons at the Paralympics
Men's marathons